Upi, officially the Municipality of Upi (Maguindanaon: Inged nu Upi; Iranun: Inged a Upi), is a 1st class municipality in the province of Maguindanao del Norte, Philippines. According to the 2020 census, it has a population of 59,004 people.

The municipality was part of the province of Shariff Kabunsuan from October 2006 until its nullification by the Supreme Court in July 2008.

Etymology
The name Upi probably derives from the term ufi. Ufi is a Teduray name for a certain tree (piper betel) that grew abundantly in the place in the early years. The bark of the ufi is used with betel nuts for chewing or mama in Teduray. The Teduray are the native inhabitants of present-day Upi.

History
The beginning of Upi as a district geographical and political entity largely began from the early part of 1901 to 1910, when American forces set foot in the then Province of Cotabato.

An American Army Officer, Captain Irving Bryant Edwards, was assigned in Awang. Edwards showed great interest in bringing the government closer to the people by establishing schools in the far-flung areas. He reached the fertile valley of Upi and founded the Upi Agricultural School on August 19, 1919. From a USAFFE soldier, Capt. Irving Bryant Edwards turned educator.

Upi was formerly a barrio of Dinaig. It was separated from Dinaig by virtue of Republic Act No. 1248, which was approved on June 10, 1955. On December 16 of the same year, President Elpidio Quirino signed Executive Order No. 142, creating 42 barrios of Upi.

The first municipal mayor, vice mayor and councilors of Upi were appointed by the president of the Philippines. Maria Badoy was appointed as the first municipal mayor. In 1956, residents of the town were encouraged to participate in the political affairs of the local government, and there took place the first election wherein Mayor Ignacio Tenorio Labina, a Teduray leader, was the first elected mayor of Upi and held his office for four years.

In 2006, Upi lost about  when the coastal barangays Kinimi, Laguitan, Lapaken, Matuber, Meti, Nalkan, Penansaran,
Sedem, Sinipak, Resa, Tambak and Tubuan were separated from the municipality to create the new municipality of Datu Blah T. Sinsuat.

Geography
Upi is a mountainous town situated in the south-western coastal portion of Maguindanao province.

Barangays
Upi is politically subdivided into 23 barangays.

 Bantek
 Bayabas
 Blensong
 Borongotan
 Bugabungan
 Bungcog
 Darugao
 Ganasi
 Kabakaba
 Kibleg
 Kibucay
 Kiga
 Kinitaan
 Mirab
 Nangi
 Nuro (Poblacion)
 Ranao Pilayan
 Rempes
 Renede
 Renti
 Rifao
 Sefegefen
 Tinungkaan

Climate

Demographics

Economy

Government
The current mayor of Upi is Ramon A. Piang Sr., a former principal of Notre Dame of Upi, a local high school managed by the Archdiocesan Notre Dame Schools of Cotabato.

List of former mayors:
 Maria Badoy                                   - 1955 - 1956 -          Appointed Mayor
 Ignacio Tenorio Labina                    - 1956 - 1960 -         First Elected Mayor
 Datu Abdullah "Ugcog" Sinsuat    - 1960 - 1963 -       Elected Mayor
 Datu Michael "Puti" P. Sinsuat        - 1963 - 1980 -        Elected Mayor
 Bai Fatima P. Sinsuat                        -1980 - 1986-           Elected Mayor
 Datu Mohammad "Unting" Sinsuat - 1986 - 1987-         Appointed Mayor
 Datu Mohammad "Unting" Sinsuat - 1987 - 1992-         Elected Mayor
 Datu Michael "Puti" P. Sinsuat         -1992 - 2001-          Elected Mayor
 Ramon A. Piang, Sr.                          -2001 - 2010 -   Elected Mayor
 Ruben D. Platon                        -2010-2011      -    Elected Mayor
 Ramon A. Piang, Sr 2011–present Appointed Mayor

Culture

Meguyaya festival
Meguyaya, a Teduray term for thanksgiving for the bountiful harvest, is an annual festival celebrated every December. The festivities incorporate street dancing competition depicting the tri-people culture of the Teduray, Maguindanaon and Settlers. Other activities include the Cultural Nights, Local Government Unit Night, Ginoong Meguyaya male pageant, trade fair and Maisan Na. This is an activity in which a long stretch of grillers are placed by the roadside where everyone enjoys roasting corns, a symbol of togetherness and feasting.

References

External links

 Upi Profile at the DTI Cities and Municipalities Competitive Index
 [ Philippine Standard Geographic Code]
 Philippine Census Information
 Local Governance Performance Management System

Municipalities of Maguindanao del Norte